Pentamethylbismuth (or pentamethylbismuthorane) is an organometalllic compound containing five methyl groups bound to a bismuth atom with formula Bi(CH3)5.  It is an example of a hypervalent compound. The molecular shape is trigonal bipyramid.

Production
Pentamethylbismuth is produced in a two step process.  First, trimethylbismuth is reacted with sulfuryl chloride to yield dichloro trimethylbismuth, which is then reacted with two equivalents of methyllithium dissolved in ether. The blue solution is cooled to −110 °C to precipitate the solid product.

Bi(CH3)3 + SO2Cl2 → Bi(CH3)3Cl2 + SO2
Bi(CH3)3Cl2 + 2LiCH3 → Bi(CH3)5 + 2LiCl

Properties

At -110 °C, Bi(CH3)5 is a blue-violet solid. The methyl groups are arranged in a trigonal bipyramid, and the bond-lengths of methyl with bismuth are all the same. However, the molecule is not rigid, as can be determined from the nuclear magnetic resonance spectrum that shows all methyl groups are equivalent. It is stable as a solid, but in the gas phase, when heated or in solution decomposes to trimethylbismuth.
The colour is unusual for bismuth or other hypervalent pnictide compounds, which are colourless. Calculations show that the colour is due to HOMO-LUMO transition. The HOMO is ligand based, whereas the LUMO is modified by relativistically stabilised bismuth 6s orbitals.

Reactions
If excess methyllithium is used in production, an orange hexamethylbismuth salt, LiBi(CH3)6, is formed . This is unusual as very few elements can form bonds with six organic groups.

References

Extra reading
 

Organobismuth compounds
Hypervalent molecules
Methyl complexes